The 46th Los Angeles Film Critics Association Awards, given by the Los Angeles Film Critics Association (LAFCA), honored the best in film for 2020.

Winners

Best Film:
Small Axe
Runner-up: Nomadland
Best Director:
Chloé Zhao – Nomadland
Runner-up: Steve McQueen – Small Axe
Best Actor:
Chadwick Boseman – Ma Rainey's Black Bottom
Runner-up: Riz Ahmed – Sound of Metal
Best Actress:
Carey Mulligan – Promising Young Woman
Runner-up: Viola Davis – Ma Rainey's Black Bottom
Best Supporting Actor:
Glynn Turman – Ma Rainey's Black Bottom
Runner up: Paul Raci – Sound of Metal
Best Supporting Actress:
Youn Yuh-jung – Minari
Runner-up: Amanda Seyfried – Mank
Best Screenplay:
Emerald Fennell – Promising Young Woman
Runner-up: Eliza Hittman – Never Rarely Sometimes Always
Best Cinematography:
Shabier Kirchner – Small Axe
Runner-up: Joshua James Richards – Nomadland
Best Editing:
Yorgos Lamprinos – The Father
Runner-up: Gabriel Rhodes – Time
Best Production Design:
Donald Graham Burt – Mank
Runner-up: Sergey Ivanov – Beanpole
Best Music Score:
Trent Reznor and Atticus Ross – Soul
Runner-up: Mica Levi – Lovers Rock
Best Foreign Language Film:
Beanpole
Runner-up: Martin Eden
Best Documentary/Non-Fiction Film:
Time
Runner-up: Collective
Best Animation:
Wolfwalkers
Runner-up: Soul
New Generation Award:
Radha Blank – The Forty-Year-Old Version
Career Achievement Award:
Harry Belafonte and Hou Hsiao-hsien
The Douglas Edwards Experimental/Independent Film/Video Award:
John Gianvito – Her Socialist Smile
Legacy Award:
Norman Lloyd

References

2020
Los Angeles Film Critics Association Awards
Los Angeles Film Critics Association Awards
Los Angeles Film Critics Association Awards
Los Angeles Film Critics Association Awards